Puliangudi is a municipal town located between Tenkasi and Rajapalayam on the National Highway 208 (Kollam to Tirumangalam).

It falls under the administrative jurisdiction of Tenkasi District and Kadayanallur Taluk. Taluk headquarters, Kadayanallur, is 16 km south from Puliangudi, and the district headquarters, Tenkasi lies 31 km south. It is called "Lemon City of India" because it has two lemon markets especially for exporting lemons.

Geography

It is mainly an agricultural based town and is famous for its Lemon market; Puliangudi is also called as ‘Lemon City’. During the past years the economic driver of the town was agriculture & allied activities.

Puliangudi town is spread across an area of 55.16 sq.km and it is divided into 33 wards. The town is located at the junction of roads from Madurai, Rajapalayam, Sankarankovil, Kadayanallur, Tenkasi, Sengottai and Kollam.  The town is surrounded in the north by Vasuthevanallur Town Panchayat and in the south by Punniyapuram Village Panchayat.  Mullikulam Village Panchayat forms the physical boundary of Puliangudi in eastern directions. Reserve forest area forms a boundary along western side.

Demographics

As per the religious census of 2011, Puliankudi (M) had 72.22% Hindus, 20.88% Muslims, 6.81% Christians, 0.01% Sikhs and 0.07% following other religions.

Agriculture
Puliangudi city is known for the cultivation of Acid lime. The climate, soil and marketing facilities are quite suitable for the cultivation of this crop, thus making this city the leader in acid lime cultivation.

Schools 
As per 2009-10 Administration Report there are totally 66 schools in this Municipal town. 

 Higher Secondary Schools - 7
 High Schools. - 31
 Matriculation Schools - 4
 Middle Schools - 10
 Primary Schools - 14

Other Training Institutes 
 Marutham TNPSC Coaching school 
 Puliyangudi Academic Achievements Resource Trust (PAART) TNPSC Coaching Center

References

External links
 
 

Cities and towns in Tirunelveli district